The 1924 St. Louis Cardinals season was the team's 43rd season in St. Louis, Missouri and its 33rd season in the National League. The Cardinals went 65–89 during the season and finished 6th in the National League.

Regular season 
Rogers Hornsby hit an astonishing .424 in 1924, which remains the modern National League record for batting average in a single season. He also led the league with 89 walks, producing a .507 on-base percentage that was the highest in the National League during the 20th century. His slugging percentage of .696 again led the league, as did his 121 runs scored, 227 hits, and 43 doubles.

Season standings

Record vs. opponents

Notable transactions 
 September 3, 1924: Tommy Thevenow was purchased by the Cardinals from the Syracuse Stars.

Roster

Player stats

Batting

Starters by position 
Note: Pos = Position; G = Games played; AB = At bats; H = Hits; Avg. = Batting average; HR = Home runs; RBI = Runs batted in

Other batters 
Note: G = Games played; AB = At bats; H = Hits; Avg. = Batting average; HR = Home runs; RBI = Runs batted in

Pitching

Starting pitchers 
Note: G = Games pitched; IP = Innings pitched; W = Wins; L = Losses; ERA = Earned run average; SO = Strikeouts

Other pitchers 
Note: G = Games pitched; IP = Innings pitched; W = Wins; L = Losses; ERA = Earned run average; SO = Strikeouts

Relief pitchers 
Note: G = Games pitched; W = Wins; L = Losses; SV = Saves; ERA = Earned run average; SO = Strikeouts

Awards and honors

League leaders 
Rogers Hornsby, National League batting champion
Rogers Hornsby led the National League in hits, doubles, runs, walks, slugging  and on-base percentage

Records 
Rogers Hornsby, National League record, Best batting average by a second baseman, (.424).

Farm system 

Tri-State League folded, July 17, 1924

References

External links
1924 St. Louis Cardinals at Baseball Reference
1924 St. Louis Cardinals team page at www.baseball-almanac.com

St. Louis Cardinals seasons
Saint Louis Cardinals season
St Louis